Michael Mabbott is a Canadian film and television director and writer. He is best known for his debut feature film as a director, The Life and Hard Times of Guy Terrifico, which won the Toronto International Film Festival Award for Best Canadian First Feature Film at the 2005 Toronto International Film Festival.

Mabbott and the film's star, musician Matt Murphy, received two Genie Award nominations for Best Original Song at the 26th Genie Awards in 2006 for the songs "Just a Show" and "Make Believe". He wrote several other songs for the film, and also contributed the song "Let's Make Love Again" to the 2009 film Defendor.

Mabbott's second feature film, Citizen Duane, was released in 2006.

He subsequently directed episodes of the television series Life with Derek, Wingin' It, Overruled! and Baxter before co-creating, with writer David Eddie, the six-episode series The Yard, which aired on HBO Canada in 2011.

References

External links

21st-century Canadian screenwriters
21st-century Canadian male writers
Canadian male screenwriters
Canadian television directors
Canadian television writers
Canadian songwriters
Film directors from Edmonton
Writers from Edmonton
Living people
Year of birth missing (living people)